Heights is a 2005 Merchant Ivory Productions film that follows a pivotal twenty-four hours in the interconnected lives of five New Yorkers. It stars Elizabeth Banks as Isabel, a photographer, James Marsden as Jonathan, a Jewish lawyer and Isabel's fiancé, Glenn Close as Diana, Isabel's mother, Jesse Bradford as Alec, an actor, and John Light as Peter, a journalist. Numerous prominent actors such as Eric Bogosian, George Segal, and Isabella Rossellini appear in supporting roles.

Plot
Over the course of 24 hours, a group of New Yorkers, whose lives are interconnected, must make pivotal decisions about their relationships. Most notably, Isabel, a photographer, is having second thoughts about her engagement to Jonathan, while her award-winning actress mother Diana suspects that her husband is having an affair and thus questions the open nature of her marriage.

Cast
Glenn Close - Diana Lee 
Elizabeth Banks - Isabel Lee 
James Marsden - Jonathan Kestler 
Jesse Bradford - Alec Lochka 
John Light - Peter Cole 
Rufus Wainwright - Jeremy 
Denis O'Hare - Andrew
Eric Bogosian - Henry 
George Segal - Rabbi Mendel 
Andrew Howard - Ian 
Isabella Rossellini - Liz 
Matthew Davis - Mark 
Michael Murphy - Jesse 
Chandler Williams - Juilliard Macbeth
Bess Wohl - Juilliard Lady Macbeth 
Thomas Lennon - Marshall 
Jim Parsons - Oliver
Angel Desai - Laura

Release
The film premiered at the 2005 Sundance Film Festival before receiving a theatrical release that June.

Reception

Critical response
  Roger Ebert gave the film a positive review, stating that "its chief pleasure comes through simple voyeurism. It is entertaining to see the lives of complex people become brutally simple all of a sudden. Variety noted the quality of the ensemble acting.

Box office
Heights grossed $1.2million in the United States and Canada, and $0.1million in other territories, for a worldwide total of $1.3million.

Awards
The film received an award from the Casting Society of America for Best Independent Feature Film Casting (with the award going to James Calleri).

References

External links
 

2005 films
American drama films
Merchant Ivory Productions films
Sony Pictures Classics films
2005 drama films
2005 directorial debut films
2000s English-language films
2000s American films